The Bajaj XCD 125 DTS-Si was a motorcycle manufactured in India by Bajaj Auto. It was launched in September 2007. It clocked up sales of 18,000 units in its first month and sold around 28,000 units per month. In January 2009, a 135 cc version of XCD was launched. Bajaj reported that more than 20,000 units of XCD 135 were sold in its first month of launch   Due to reduced sales, the 125 cc version was discontinued by Bajaj in November 2009, followed by the 135cc variant.

Design and styling
Bajaj XCD was the first 125 cc bike in India to feature LCD instruments in the console. It also features a spring-loaded foldable number plate which prevents damage to the low mounted fairing in case of sudden front fork The 135 cc variant features the same analog tachometer and digital speedometer as the Bajaj Discover

Ride and handling
Although the XCD provides the right ergonomics for the average Indian, it has been found to be uncomfortable for taller people. The rider has an upright stance and the small wheelbase and the tall handlebar is designed for city riding.

Performance and fuel economy
The bike has a top speed of around 90 km/h and does 0–60 km/h in 8 seconds.

Awards
Bajaj XCD has won the following awards in 2008:
Bike of the year—Business Standard Motoring
Bike of the year up to 125 cc—Bike India
Bike of the year—CNBC-TV18 Autocar awards

References

External links
Manufacturer model information (Adobe Flash)

XCD